Chéri was a Canadian female dance music duo from Montreal, consisting of American Rosalind Milligan Hunt and Canadian Lise Cullerier. They had one Billboard top 40 hit, "Murphy's Law", in 1982.

History
Friends Hunt and Cullerier began singing together at the suggestion of Hunt's mother, singer Geraldine Hunt. Calling their duo Chéri, in 1982 they recorded a single, "Murphy's Law", which became their only Billboard Hot 100 entry, peaking at #39. The song also hit number-one on the Billboard Hot Dance Music/Club Play chart and is notable for its speed-up vocal chorus ("got it all together, dontcha baby"). The song was written by Geraldine Hunt and Daniel Joseph, and released on Venture Records.

Chéri continued to record, following up with another single "Give It to Me Baby", and also that year released an album, Murphy's Law, which included the hit single. Some of Chéri's recordings featured Amy Roslyn instead of Cullerier.

In 1983 the band released the album Love Stew through the label 21 Records.

Discography

Albums
Chéri (21 Records, 1982) (Canada only)
Murphy's Law (Venture Records, 1982) (US only)
Love Stew (21 Records, 1983)

Singles

See also
List of Billboard number-one dance club songs
List of artists who reached number one on the U.S. Dance Club Songs chart

References

External links

Musical groups established in 1982
Musical groups disestablished in 1983
Musical groups from Montreal
Canadian dance music groups
Canadian boogie musicians
1982 establishments in Quebec
Canadian girl groups